Wilson was a community in Pushmataha County, Oklahoma, United States, 12 miles north of Antlers.

A United States Post Office operated here from October 15, 1908, to August 15, 1910. No longer in existence, the community and its post office were named for Benjamin D. Wilson, first postmaster.

More information on Wilson may be found in the Pushmataha County Historical Society.

References

External links

Unincorporated communities in Oklahoma
Geography of Pushmataha County, Oklahoma